Estadio Nejapa is a multi-use stadium in Nejapa, El Salvador.  It is currently used mostly for football matches and is the home stadium of Nejapa F.C.  The stadium has a capacity of 5,000 people.

Nejapa